David R. Kaeli is an American computer scientist and Northeastern University College of Engineering Distinguished Professor in Electrical and Computer Engineering. He has been cited over 10,000 times. His research involves the design and performance of high-performance computer systems and software.

Early life 
Kaeli received a B.S. in Electrical Engineering from Rutgers University, an M.S. in Computer Engineering from Syracuse University, and a Ph.D. in Electrical Engineering at Rutgers University. He worked for 12 years at IBM before moving to academia. He is an honorary professor at the City University of London.

Kaeli has served two terms as the Chair of the IEEE Technical Committee on Computer Architecture (TCCA).  He is presently on the TCCA Executive Committee.

Selected research
Patterson, David A., and John L. Hennessy. Computer organization and design MIPS edition: the hardware/software interface. Newnes, 2013.
Kaeli, David R., et al. Heterogeneous computing with OpenCL 2.0. Morgan Kaufmann, 2015.
Ubal, Rafael, et al. "Multi2Sim: a simulation framework for CPU-GPU computing." 2012 21st International Conference on Parallel Architectures and Compilation Techniques (PACT). IEEE, 2012.
Jang, Byunghyun, et al. "Exploiting memory access patterns to improve memory performance in data-parallel architectures." IEEE Transactions on Parallel and Distributed Systems 22.1 (2010): 105-118.

References

21st-century American engineers
Living people
Year of birth missing (living people)
Place of birth missing (living people)
Northeastern University faculty
American electrical engineers
Computer engineers
Rutgers University alumni
Syracuse University alumni
IBM employees
Fellow Members of the IEEE
Computer scientists
Date of birth missing (living people)